Sue Maslin  is an Australian screen producer. She is best known for her feature films Road to Nhill (1997) Japanese Story (2003) and The Dressmaker (2015).

Early life 
Maslin was raised in rural New South Wales, moving to Canberra to attend university. Initially graduating with a Bachelor of Science from Australian National University, Maslin then went on to graduate from Canberra College of Advanced Education with a Bachelor of Media Studies. It was here that Maslin met Daryl Dellora, her long-term business partner and co-founder of  Film Art Media and Film Art Doco.

Politicised on campus by the birth of second-generation feminism in Australia, Maslin started what would become a lifelong fight for women's rights. Maslin was among the Women Against Rape demonstrators arrested and charged in Canberra for controversially using the platform of ANZAC Day to protest rape being used as a weapon in war. It was Maslin's commitment to gender equity and celebrating women in history that was the genesis of her first theatrical documentary project, Thanks Girls and Goodbye (1988).

Career 
Maslin is a graduate from the Australian National University and the Canberra CAE where she studied radio, photography, film and television.

Maslin wrote, directed and produced her first feature documentary Thanks Girls and Goodbye (1988), which wrote the missing chapter in history about the Australian Land Army – the women who worked on farms during the Second World War and supported the war effort through food production. She then went on to produce feature documentary Mr Neal Is Entitled to Be an Agitator (1991) alongside director Daryl Dellora which was nominated for Best Documentary at the Australian Film Institute Award in 1992. Maslin went on to produce series Conspiracy (1994) and her first feature drama Road to Nhill (1997)  with director Sue Brooks. Road to Nhill won the Golden Alexander Award (Sue Brooks) at Thessaloniki Film Festival and the Holden Award for the Best Script (Alison Tilson ) at the Torino International Festival of Young Cinema in 1997.

In 1998 Maslin produced feature documentary The Highest Court, which shows first hand the characters and drama of the High Court of Australia, the pinnacle of legal and constitutional processes in Australia. Maslin then went on to tell the story of Jørn Utzon, acclaimed architect of the Sydney Opera House in The Edge of Possible (1998).

Maslin's teamed up again with director Sue Brooks and writer Alison Tilson on Japanese Story (2003). Featuring Toni Collette and Gotaro Tsunashima, Japanese Story went on to win multiple awards and nominations including Best Film at the Australian Film Institute Awards, Film Critics Circle of Australia Awards and IF Awards in 2003. Following Japanese Story, Maslin produced and executive produced a number of Australian documentaries including Irresistible (executive producer), Hunt Angels (producer)  – winner of the 2006 AFI Award for Best Feature Documentary Film, Celebrity: Dominick Dunne (producer), Michael Kirby: Don't Forget the Justice Bit (producer), Breaking the News (executive producer) and Ringbalin: Breaking the Drought (executive producer).

Maslin produced The Dressmaker alongside director Jocelyn Moorhouse which was released in 2015. Starring Kate Winslet, Judy Davis, Liam Hemsworth and Hugo Weaving, the film was released following the very successful book of the same title written by Rosalie Ham. The film was one of the most successful in Australian history grossing $20 million at the Box Office  and garnered the highest number of nominations at the 2015 Australian Academy of Cinema and Television Arts(AACTA) Awards, winning five including the People's Choice Award for Favourite Australian Film.

Maslin produced and/or executive produced the feature documentary Harry Seidler: Modernist (2017)  comedy series Other People's Problems (2017), documentary Paper Trails (2017), feature documentary Jill Bilcock: Dancing The Invisible (2017), The Show Must Go On (2019) and Brazen Hussies (2020).

Maslin holds the position of Adjunct Professor at the RMIT School of Media and Communications as well as Adjunct Fellow at Swinburne University School of Film and Television. She is a founding course leader for Compton School developing the Creative Leadership program.

Advocacy 

In 1988 Maslin founded Women in Film and Television (Victoria), seeking to address gender bias in the film industry. From 2010 Maslin has been president of the Natalie Miller Fellowship, an organisation supporting the professional leadership of women in all sectors of the Australian screen industry.

She has served on numerous boards, including the Australian Film Institute, Film Victoria, Adelaide Film Festival and the Documentary Australia Foundation.

Awards and honours
Maslin was the inaugural recipient of the Jill Robb Award for Outstanding leadership, achievement and service to the Victorian screen industry in 2012.

She was appointed Charles Herschell Fellowship, Swinburne University 2018 and the Distinguished Alumni Award for Canberra University in 2019.

In 2018 Maslin was inducted onto the Victorian Honour Roll of Women in 2018.

In 2019 she was made an Officer of the Order of Australia for "distinguished service to the Australian film industry as a producer, and through roles with professional bodies".

In 2021, Maslin won the Chauvel Award, which acknowledges significant contribution to the Australian screen industry.

Selected filmography 
Maslin's documentary films include  Mr Neal is Entitled to be an Agitator (1991),  The Edge of the Possible (1998), Hunt Angels (2006), Michael Kirby – Don't Forget The Justice Bit (2010)  and The Show Must Go On (2019). She is also a distributor of independent documentary films through her company Film Art Media established in 2008 with Daryl Dellora.

References

External links 
 

Living people
Year of birth missing (living people)
Officers of the Order of Australia
Australian women film producers
Australian National University alumni